Mimochariergus fluminensis is a species of beetle in the family Cerambycidae. It was described by Napp and Mermudes in 1999.

References

Compsocerini
Beetles described in 1999